The  is a Commuter Limited Express train service operated by West Japan Railway Company (JR West) between  and  or  in Japan since June 2003. It replaced the previous Biwako Liner services.

Service pattern

Rolling stock 
 683 series 9-car EMU sets
 KiHa 189 series 3-car DMU (since March 2014)

Services were initially operated using the nine-car 681 series or 683 series EMUs used on Thunderbird services.

Formations

Biwako Express 1 and 4
Biwako Express 1 and 4 (between Osaka and Maibara) are formed as follows, with car 1 at the Maibara end.

Biwako Express 2 
Biwako Express 2 (Osaka to Kusatsu) is formed as follows, with car 1 at the Osaka end.

 All cars are standard class and no-smoking.
 Trains run as 6-car formations during busy periods.

History
The Biwako Express service was introduced from 2 June 2003.

The service was made entirely no-smoking from 1 June 2009.

The service start calling at Minami-Kusatsu Station, all seats become reserved from 13 March 2021.

See also
 List of named passenger trains of Japan

References

External links
 JR West 683 series Biwako Express 
 JR West KiHa 189 series Biwako Express 

Named passenger trains of Japan
West Japan Railway Company
Railway services introduced in 2003
2003 establishments in Japan